Jazz at Santa Monica '72 is a 1972 live album by the American jazz singer Ella Fitzgerald, recorded at the Santa Monica Civic Auditorium accompanied by a jazz trio led by the pianist Tommy Flanagan, and the Count Basie Orchestra.

This concert recording was initially sold through mail order by the jazz producer and impresario, Norman Granz, as a three-LP set. The success of the album led to Granz founding Pablo Records, his first record label since Verve Records, which he had sold to MGM in 1960.

The concert was originally announced as featuring only the Count Basie Orchestra and Ella Fitzgerald, but Granz had invited some surprise "guests", the trumpeters Roy Eldridge and Harry "Sweets" Edison, the tenor saxophonists, Stan Getz and Eddie "Lockjaw" Davis, and the pianist Oscar Peterson and bassist Ray Brown.

Track listing
Introductions by Norman Granz  – 1:00
"Basie Power" (Ernie Wilkins)  – 3:07
"The Spirit Is Willing" (Sammy Nestico)  – 4:37
"The Meetin' Time" (Oliver Nelson)  – 4:50
"Blues in Hoss's Flat" (Count Basie, Frank Foster)  – 5:08
"Good Time Blues" (Wilkins)  – 7:34
"In a Mellow Tone" (Duke Ellington, Milt Gabler)  – 15:00
"Loose Walk" (Johnny Richards, Sonny Stitt)  – 10:48
"Makin' Whoopee" (Walter Donaldson, Gus Kahn)  – 2:57
"If I Had You" (Jimmy Campbell, Reginald Connelly, Ted Shapiro)  – 3:26
"She's Funny That Way" (Neil Moret, Richard Whiting)  – 3:05
"Blue and Sentimental" (Basie, Mack David, Jerry Livingston)  – 1:58
"I Surrender Dear" (Harry Barris, Gordon Clifford)  – 3:11
"5400 North" (Roy Eldridge)  – 13:34
"You Are My Sunshine" (Jimmie Davis, Charles Mitchell)  – 8:41
"L.O.V.E." (Milt Gabler, Bert Kaempfert)  – 3:16
"Begin the Beguine" (Cole Porter)  – 4:27
"Indian Summer" (Al Dubin, Victor Herbert)  – 4:34
"You've Got a Friend" (Carole King)  – 5:12
"What's Going On" (Renaldo Benson, Al Cleveland, Marvin Gaye)  – 4:06
"Night and Day" (Porter)  – 5:17
"Spring Can Really Hang You Up the Most" (Fran Landesman, Tommy Wolf)  – 4:13
"Little White Lies" (Walter Donaldson)  – 3:24
"Madalena" (Ronaldo Monteiro de Souza, Ivan Lins)  – 3:37
"Shiny Stockings" (Foster, Ella Fitzgerald)  – 3:55
Cole Porter Medley: "Too Darn Hot"/"It's All Right With Me" (Porter)  – 3:20
"Sanford and Son Theme" ("The Streetbeater") (Fitzgerald, Quincy Jones)  – 2:58
"I Can't Stop Loving You" (Don Gibson)  – 6:12
"C Jam Blues" (Barney Bigard, Ellington)  – 11:05

Personnel
Recorded June 2, 1972, in Santa Monica, California:

Tracks 2-6
 Count Basie Orchestra
Tracks 7-14
 Jazz at the Philharmonic All Stars
Track 15
 Oscar Peterson
Tracks 16-20
 Ella Fitzgerald
 Count Basie Orchestra
 Tommy Flanagan - Piano
 Frank DeLaRosa - Double Bass
 Ed Thigpen - drums
Tracks 21-24
 Ella Fitzgerald - Vocals
 Tommy Flanagan - Piano
 Frank DeLaRosa - Double Bass
 Ed Thigpen - Drums
Tracks 25-28
 Ella Fitzgerald
 Count Basie Orchestra
 Tommy Flanagan - Piano
 Frank DeLaRosa - Double Bass
 Ed Thigpen - Drums
Track 29
 Ella Fitzgerald
 Count Basie
 Jazz at the Philharmonic All Stars

References

1972 live albums
Count Basie Orchestra live albums
Ella Fitzgerald live albums
Albums produced by Norman Granz
Albums recorded at the Santa Monica Civic Auditorium
Pablo Records live albums